Foote Station was a community in Mineral County, West Virginia. It was located on Horseshoe Run Road about one mile (1.6 km) from Georges Run Road. The farm house owned by Hampshire County, Virginia Delegate James Allen still stands at Foote Station. Before modern transportation was available, Foote Station was a stagecoach stop and also had a post office.

References 

Ghost towns in West Virginia
Geography of Mineral County, West Virginia